Koppula Eshwar is an Indian politician serving as the Minister of All Welfare Departments, BC Welfare in Telangana. He belongs to Telangana Rashtra Samithi. He won as a Member of Legislative Assembly (M.L.A.) from Dharmapuri constituency in Karimnagar assembly constituency.

Life
Eshwar was born in Kummarikunta village of Julapalli Mandal, Karimnagar district in a Scheduled caste community. His mother is Mallamma and father Lingaiah.

Political career 
Koppula Eshwar was born on April 20, 1959 and is a Graduate in Arts. A six time MLA from Karimnagar district, he started his political career in Telugu Desam Party in 1994 and continued as MLA from Medaram Assembly constituency and later from Dharmapuri Assembly constituency.

He joined TRS in 2001 and actively participated in Telangana agitation. He was elected MLA from Medaram constituency in 2004 after Mathang Narsaiah retired. He was reelected in 2008 from Medaram, 2009 in general elections, and 2010 by elections from Dharmapuri.

He worked in Singareni Collieries Company Limited for 26 years and served as Government Chief Whip from 2014 to 2018.

Positions held

Political statistics 

Koppula Eshwar contested as Member of Legislative Assembly from Medaram and Darmapuri (Assembly constituency).

References

Telangana Rashtra Samithi politicians
Living people
People from Karimnagar
Telangana MLAs 2014–2018
Telangana MLAs 2018–2023
1959 births